Newton County is a county located in the north central portion of the U.S. state of Georgia. As of the 2020 census, the population was 112,483. The county seat is Covington.

Newton County is included in the Atlanta-Sandy Springs-Roswell, GA Metropolitan Statistical Area.

History
Newton county is named after Sgt. John Newton, who served under Gen. Francis Marion, the "Swamp Fox", in the American Revolutionary War. It was created on December 24, 1821.  

During the American Civil War, the county provided the Lamar Infantry, which was a part of Cobb's Legion. The 1860 census shows the enslaved population was nearly half, 45.2 percent.  Newton County adjoins Jasper County: Georgia is one of many states that have a Newton County and a Jasper County that border each other.

In late 1978, the first five episodes of The Dukes of Hazzard were filmed in and around Covington, Georgia. The TV series In The Heat of the Night was filmed in Covington from 1988 to 1995. Also, in Remember the Titans, there were many scenes shot on "The Square" and the final football scene was shot at Homer Sharp Stadium, which is located near downtown Covington. Currently part of the new series The Vampire Diaries is being filmed on "The Square". Additionally, major films including My Cousin Vinny, Friday the 13th Part VI: Jason Lives and Halloween II, Rob Zombie's sequel to his 2007 film Halloween, were also filmed near and around "The Square" in downtown Covington.

Newton County claims to be the birthplace of Georgia 4-H. Actually, the Girls Canning and Boys Corn Clubs in 1904 by G.C. Adams was renamed the 4-H Club in 1906, after the original 4-H Club that opened in Iowa in 1905.

Geography
The county is located in the Piedmont region of the state.

The majority of Newton County is located in the Upper Ocmulgee River sub-basin of the Altamaha River basin. A small eastern portion of the county, from southwest of Social Circle to southwest of Newborn, is located in the Upper Oconee River sub-basin of the same Altamaha River basin.

Major highways

  Interstate 20
  U.S. Route 278
  State Route 11
  State Route 12
  State Route 20
  State Route 36
  State Route 81
  State Route 138
  State Route 142
  State Route 162
  State Route 162 Connector
  State Route 212
  State Route 402 (unsigned designation for I-20)

Adjacent counties
 Walton County (north)
 Morgan County (east)
 Jasper County (southeast)
 Butts County (south)
 Henry County (West-southwest)
 Rockdale County (northwest)

Demographics

2000 census
As of the census of 2000, there were 62,001 people, 21,997 households, and 17,113 families living in the county. There were 23,033 housing units at an average density of 83 per square mile (32/km2). The racial makeup of the county was 75.27% White, 22.21% Black or African American, 0.22% Native American, 0.72% Asian, 0.02% Pacific Islander, 0.58% from other races, and 0.98% from two or more races.  1.87% of the population were Hispanic or Latino of any race.

There were 21,997 households, out of which 37.70% had children under the age of 18 living with them, 59.20% were married couples living together, 14.10% had a female householder with no husband present, and 22.20% were non-families. 18.30% of all households were made up of individuals, and 6.60% had someone living alone who was 65 years of age or older.  The average household size was 2.77 and the average family size was 3.14.

In the county, the population was spread out, with 27.70% under the age of 18, 8.90% from 18 to 24, 32.10% from 25 to 44, 21.50% from 45 to 64, and 9.90% who were 65 years of age or older.  The median age was 33 years. For every 100 females, there were 94.70 males.  For every 100 females age 18 and over, there were 90.20 males.

The median income for a household in the county was $44,875, and the median income for a family was $49,748. Males had a median income of $36,742 versus $26,097 for females. The per capita income for the county was $19,317.  About 7.20% of families and 10.00% of the population were below the poverty line, including 14.90% of those under age 18 and 8.80% of those age 65 or over.

2010 census
As of the 2010 United States Census, there were 99,958 people, 34,390 households, and 26,165 families living in the county. The racial makeup of the county was 53.8% white, 40.9% black or African American, 0.9% Asian, 0.2% American Indian, 2.1% from other races, and 2.1% from two or more races. Those of Hispanic or Latino origin made up 4.6% of the population. In terms of ancestry, 13.4% were American, 9.2% were Irish, 8.0% were English, and 7.5% were German.

Of the 34,390 households, 43.5% had children under the age of 18 living with them, 51.5% were married couples living together, 19.0% had a female householder with no husband present, 23.9% were non-families, and 19.6% of all households were made up of individuals. The average household size was 2.85 and the average family size was 3.27. The median age was 34.7 years.

The median income for a household in the county was $52,361 and the median income for a family was $56,519. Males had a median income of $44,504 versus $33,133 for females. The per capita income for the county was $21,583. About 10.8% of families and 12.7% of the population were below the poverty line, including 16.5% of those under age 18 and 7.3% of those age 65 or over.

2020 census

As of the 2020 United States census, there were 112,483 people, 37,867 households, and 28,095 families residing in the county.

Education

Communities
 Covington (county seat)
 Mansfield
 Newborn
 Oxford
 Porterdale
 Social Circle
 Starrsville

Politics
For the first half of the 20th century, Newton County followed the regular Solid South pattern of voting Democratic. It would later become a state bellwether from 1968 to 2004--meaning that Newton's voting was an accurate predictor of the overall statewide winner. From 2008 to 2016 Newton had been narrowly won by Democrats thanks to its location within the Atlanta metro and the influx of progressive voters both the region and Newton have experienced in recent years. This margin ballooned to a double digit percentage in 2020 as Joe Biden flipped the state back into the Democratic column.

See also

 National Register of Historic Places listings in Newton County, Georgia
List of counties in Georgia

References

External links
 Covington and Newton County Living
 The City of Covington official site
 Downtown Covington
 The Covington/Newton County Chamber of Commerce
 The Center for Community Preservation and Planning
 The Covington News
 The Newton Citizen
 Turner Scrapbook Collection from the Digital Library Collection

 
Georgia (U.S. state) counties
1821 establishments in Georgia (U.S. state)
Populated places established in 1821
Newton
Majority-minority counties in Georgia